Kelsey Head is a coastal Site of Special Scientific Interest (SSSI) and headland in north Cornwall, England, UK, noted for its biological interest. The site contains an Iron Age hill fort.

Geography
It starts at Holywell Beach, near Holywell village in the west and ends at the headland of Pentire Point West, near West Pentire, in the east. The site also includes the inlet of Porth Joke as well as the inland areas of The Kelseys and Cubert Common.

The South West Coast Path runs through the SSSI and most of the coastline is owned by the National Trust.

History
But there is evidence of earlier habitation on the site, of Mesolithic and Neolithic periods, through the discovery of flint flakes not related to the cliff castle. The cliff castle features evidence of earth and stone ramparts, a smaller annexe and an earthwork and external ditch protecting the south-eastern, inland, side.

Wildlife and ecology

The two main habitats of the SSSI are the sand dunes of Holywell Bay and the calcareous grassland of Cubert Common. Other smaller habitats include meadows, scrubland, wet flushes, woodland, offshore islands and intertidal habitats.

These habitats support several invertebrate species and colonies of seabirds.

References

Sites of Special Scientific Interest in Cornwall
Sites of Special Scientific Interest notified in 1951
National Trust properties in Cornwall
Hill forts in Cornwall